Elections to South Hams District Council took place on 1 May 2003, the same day as other United Kingdom local elections. The whole council was up for election and the Conservative Party retained overall control of the council.

References

2003 English local elections
2003
2000s in Devon